Events from the year 1756 in France

Incumbents
 Monarch – Louis XV

Events
12 April – French invasion of Minorca, at this time under British control.
1 May – Treaty of Versailles.
18 May – The Seven Years' War formally begins when Great Britain declares war on France.
20 May – Battle of Minorca: The French fleet under Roland-Michel Barrin de La Galissonière defeats the British under John Byng.
29 June – The 2-month Siege of Fort St Philip at Port Mahon ends when the British garrison in Minorca surrenders to the French after two months' siege by Armand de Vignerot du Plessis.
14 August – French and Indian War: Fort Oswego falls to the French.

Arts and literature
François Boucher paints portraits of Madame de Pompadour.
The Vincennes porcelain factory moves to Sèvres as the Manufacture nationale de Sèvres.

Births
 
3 January – Jérôme Pétion de Villeneuve, writer and politician (died 1794)
23 May – Charles Clément Balvay (called Bervic), engraver (died 1822)
28 November – Marie-Madeleine Postel, Roman Catholic saint (died 1846)
24 December – Joseph François Augustin Monneron, banker and politician (died 1826)
Full date missing – Antoine-François Momoro, printer, bookseller and politician (died 1794)

Deaths
27 June – Marie Sallé, dancer and choreographer (born 1707)
16 April – Jacques Cassini, astronomer (born 1677)

See also

References

1750s in France